The North Carolina Central Eagles refer to the 14 sports teams representing North Carolina Central University (NCCU) in Durham, North Carolina in intercollegiate athletics, including men and women's basketball, cross country, tennis, and track and field; women's sports include bowling, softball, and volleyball; men's sports include baseball and golf. The Eagles compete in the NCAA Division I Football Championship Subdivision (FCS) and are members of the Mid-Eastern Athletic Conference. As of the 2022–23 school year, men's and women's golf compete in the Northeast Conference.

Teams

Championships

References

External links